Bill's is a British restaurant and bar chain, founded by Bill Collison in 2001 when he opened a small greengrocery in Lewes, East Sussex.

As of January 2020, there are 78 branches in the UK, down from 81 in September 2018. With home deliveries on the rise, Bill’s launched a takeaway and ‘click and collect’ service to expand their offering.

History
The first restaurant was founded in Lewes, East Sussex. It began as a greengrocer's, but after a flood, a cafe was added to the shop. It has been followed by an expansion of restaurants around the UK featuring locally sourced produce and menus for breakfast, lunch, dinner and teatime.

References

External links 

Restaurant chains in the United Kingdom
European restaurants in the United Kingdom